Lake Station Community Schools is a school district headquartered in Lake Station, Indiana, United States. The district serves most of Lake Station.

Schools
Lake Station has two elementary schools and a secondary school.

Primary schools
  Virgil I. Bailey Elementary School
 Alexander Hamilton Elementary School
 Carl J. Polk Elementary School

Secondary school
 Thomas A. Edison Junior-Senior High School

References

External links

School districts in Indiana
Education in Lake County, Indiana